Tina Gordon Chism is an American screenwriter, producer, and director. She began her writing career writing the films ATL, and Drumline. She made her directorial debut in the 2013 film Peeples, which she also wrote. In 2019, she co-wrote the scripts to the comedies What Men Want and Little, while directing the latter. She will write and direct the upcoming film, Praise This. She has also acted as a consulting producer on Good Girls.

Chism studied drama at Duke Ellington School for Performing Arts. She was inspired by The Cosby Show to tell stories of rich black families. In 2013, HBO greenlit a new series created by Chism called Crushed. In 2016, the pilot for Crushed was picked up by Hulu.

References

External links

African-American screenwriters
African-American film directors
American women film directors
American women screenwriters
American film directors
Living people
Year of birth missing (living people)
21st-century African-American people
21st-century African-American women
African-American women writers